Platydoris esakii is a species of sea slug, a dorid nudibranch, shell-less marine opisthobranch gastropod mollusks in the family Discodorididae.

Distribution
The holotype for this species was collected at Ishigaki Island, Yaeyama Islands, Ryukyu Islands, Japan.

References

Discodorididae
Gastropods described in 1936